Lorenzo Ochoa Salas (25 May 19437 December 2009) was a Mexican archaeologist. He was born in Tuxpan, Veracruz. He obtained a master's degree in anthropology, with a speciality in archaeology from the National School of Anthropology and History. He completed his doctorate in archaeology at the Faculty of Philosophy and Letters of the National Autonomous University of Mexico.

Ochoa's books include Historia prehispánica de la Huaxteca (UNAM, 1979).

Ochoa died of respiratory disease in Mexico City on 7 December 2009. The magazine Voices of Mexico devoted a special section in his memory in 2010.

References

1943 births
2009 deaths
Mexican archaeologists
People from Tuxpan, Veracruz
National Autonomous University of Mexico alumni